Nitro World Games 2017 was an action sports competition by Nitro Circus that took place on June 24, 2017, at the Rice-Eccles Stadium in Salt Lake City, Utah.

The games were broadcast live through social media platforms.

Results

Medal count

Podium Details

References

External links
Website

2017 in sports in Utah
2017 in multi-sport events
2017 in motorcycle sport